Nosferatu is the eleventh album by Popol Vuh and was released as the original motion picture soundtrack of Nosferatu: Phantom der Nacht by director Werner Herzog. It was originally released in 1978. In 2004 SPV re-released the album with a slightly different track list and adding four tracks originally released on the Popol Vuh album Brüder des Schattens – Söhne des Lichts.

Track listing
"Mantra" – 6:14 
"Morning Sun Rays" – 3:20 
"Venus Principle" – 4:39 
"Mantra II" – 5:22 
"Auf dem Weg - On the Way" - 3:20 (bonus track - only on vinyl reissue) 
"On the Way" – 4:02 
"Through Pain To Heaven" – 3:46 
"To a Little Way" – 2:34 
"Zwiesprache der Rohrflöte mit der Sängerin" – 3:20 
"Die Nacht der Himmel" – 4:50 
"Der Ruf der Rohrflöte" – 3:39

CD and vinyl reissues altered this track listing slightly.

Personnel 
Florian Fricke – piano, Moog synthesizer
Daniel Fichelscher – E-guitar, acoustic guitar, percussion

Guest musicians
Robert Eliscu – oboe
Alois Gromer – sitar
Ted de Jong – tamboura
A chorus from Munich

Credits 
Recorded at Bavaria Studio, Munich, August 1978 
Produced by Gerhard Augustin

Notes 
Swedish progressive death metal band Opeth has been known to use "Through Pain to Heaven" as their entrance music for live concerts.

References

External links 

http://www.furious.com/perfect/populvuh.html (Comprehensive article & review of every album, in English)
https://web.archive.org/web/20080119184752/http://www.enricobassi.it/popvuhdiscografia70.htm (featuring the original credits)
http://www.venco.com.pl/~acrux/nosferat.htm

1978 soundtrack albums
Albums produced by Gerhard Augustin
Horror film soundtracks
Nosferatu
Popol Vuh (band) soundtracks